Miss Moon is a French animated children's television series created by Sébastien Dorsey and Laure Doyonnax. The series debuted on TFOU TV in France on April 17, 2016. The series also aired on OUFtivi in Belgium. The English dub, along with the Hungarian, Polish, Romanian, and Russian dubs, all premiered on Boomerang in Central and Eastern Europe on October 8, 2016.

Premise
Miss Moon is about a magical nanny called Miss Moon, as she takes care of three kids while their parents are at work, along with the problems that come with the job.

Characters

Main characters
 Miss Moon is the title character, and a magical nanny who takes care of Jules, Lola, and Baby Joe while their parents are at work.
 Lady Pop is the kids' mother, who is an international rockstar.
 Paul is the kids' father, who is a renowned veterinarian.
 Jules
 Lola
 Baby Joe

Episodes
In total, 52 episodes have been produced and planned for broadcast.

Series overview

Broadcast
Brazilian Portuguese and Latin American Spanish dubs premiered on Discovery Kids in Latin America on September 5, 2016. A European Spanish dub premiered on Canal Panda in Spain on July 11, 2016. The series is also broadcast on Kanal 2 in Estonia.

References

External links

 Miss Moon on Canal Panda (Spain)
 Miss Moon on Discovery Kids (Brazil)
 Miss Moon on Discovery Kids (Latin America)
 Miss Moon on OUFtivi

2016 French television series debuts
French animated television series
French children's television series
French-language television shows